
Year 22 BC was either a common year starting on Sunday, Monday or Tuesday or a leap year starting on Sunday or Saturday (link will display the full calendar) of the Julian calendar (the sources differ, see leap year error for further information) and a common year starting on Saturday of the Proleptic Julian calendar. At the time, it was known as the Year of the Consulship of Marcellus and Arruntius (or, less frequently, year 732 Ab urbe condita). The denomination 22 BC for this year has been used since the early medieval period, when the Anno Domini calendar era became the prevalent method in Europe for naming years.

Events 
 By place 

 Roman Empire 
 Aemilius Lepidus Paullus and Lucius Munatius Plancus are Censors.
 The Roman governor of Egypt, Gaius Petronius, marches up the Nile with legions XXII Deiotariana and III Cyrenaica, and destroys the Nubian capital of Napata.
 King Artaxias II returns, with the support of the Parthians, to Armenia and claims the throne. Artavasdes I escapes to Rome, where Caesar Augustus receives him.

Deaths 
 Lucius Licinius Varro Murena, Roman politician

References